The TRT is Turkish Radio and Television Corporation, a tax-funded public national broadcaster.TRT may also refer to:

Broadcasting

Turkish Radio and Television Corporation
 TRT 1
 TRT 2
 TRT 3
 TRT 4
 TRT Avaz
 TRT Arabi
 TRT Belgesel
 TRT Haber
 TRT Kurdî
 TRT Türk
 TRT World

Other uses
 Tamil Radio and Television, later Tamil Television Network, France
 Televisora Regional del Táchira, a Venezuelan television network
 Thessalian Radio Television, Greece

Engineering
 Thermal response test of the ground
 Transport relay translation, an Internet method 
 Transition radiation tracker of the ATLAS experiment
 Service-level agreement total resolution time, to complete a task

Medicine
 Testosterone replacement therapy
 Tinnitus retraining therapy

Transportation
 Tidewater Regional Transit, Virginia, US
 Tshiuetin Rail Transportation, Canada, former reporting mark

Other uses
 Thai Rak Thai (TRT), a former Thai political party
 TRT: La Máquina de la Destrucción, a Mexican wrestling group
 Time in Turkey or Turkey time zone
 Tongrentang, a Chinese pharmaceutical company
 trt, ISO 639 code for the Tunggare language, in Indonesia